Moscow City Duma District 41 is one of 45 constituencies in Moscow City Duma. The constituency covers parts of Western Moscow. District 41 was created in 2013, after Moscow City Duma had been expanded from 35 to 45 seats.

Members elected

Election results

2014

|-
! colspan=2 style="background-color:#E9E9E9;text-align:left;vertical-align:top;" |Candidate
! style="background-color:#E9E9E9;text-align:left;vertical-align:top;" |Party
! style="background-color:#E9E9E9;text-align:right;" |Votes
! style="background-color:#E9E9E9;text-align:right;" |%
|-
|style="background-color:"|
|align=left|Pavel Poselyonov
|align=left|United Russia
|
|40.26%
|-
|style="background-color:"|
|align=left|Maria Aleksandrova
|align=left|Communist Party
|
|19.64%
|-
|style="background-color:"|
|align=left|Oleg Kazenkov
|align=left|A Just Russia
|
|11.16%
|-
|style="background-color:"|
|align=left|Pyotr Lempert
|align=left|Civic Platform
|
|10.63%
|-
|style="background-color:"|
|align=left|Dmitry Tupikin
|align=left|Yabloko
|
|7.38%
|-
|style="background-color:"|
|align=left|Ruslan Zakharkin
|align=left|Liberal Democratic Party
|
|7.15%
|-
| colspan="5" style="background-color:#E9E9E9;"|
|- style="font-weight:bold"
| colspan="3" style="text-align:left;" | Total
| 
| 100%
|-
| colspan="5" style="background-color:#E9E9E9;"|
|- style="font-weight:bold"
| colspan="4" |Source:
|
|}

2019

|-
! colspan=2 style="background-color:#E9E9E9;text-align:left;vertical-align:top;" |Candidate
! style="background-color:#E9E9E9;text-align:left;vertical-align:top;" |Party
! style="background-color:#E9E9E9;text-align:right;" |Votes
! style="background-color:#E9E9E9;text-align:right;" |%
|-
|style="background-color:"|
|align=left|Yevgeny Gerasimov
|align=left|Independent
|
|41.08%
|-
|style="background-color:"|
|align=left|Olga Frolova
|align=left|Communist Party
|
|34.38%
|-
|style="background-color:"|
|align=left|Aleksey Sobolev
|align=left|Independent
|
|7.26%
|-
|style="background-color:"|
|align=left|German Bogatyrenko
|align=left|Liberal Democratic Party
|
|7.02%
|-
|style="background-color:"|
|align=left|Yekaterina Pavlova
|align=left|Communists of Russia
|
|6.53%
|-
| colspan="5" style="background-color:#E9E9E9;"|
|- style="font-weight:bold"
| colspan="3" style="text-align:left;" | Total
| 
| 100%
|-
| colspan="5" style="background-color:#E9E9E9;"|
|- style="font-weight:bold"
| colspan="4" |Source:
|
|}

References

Moscow City Duma districts